Ana Frega Novales (born 1958) is an Uruguayan writer and historian.

Biography
Frega began her doctoral studies at the University of Buenos Aires in 1996 and obtained her PhD in 2005.

Since 1987, Frega has been a professor at the Instituto de Profesores Artigas, teaching National History II and La Plata's regional history since 2008. In 2006, she became a professor of history at the University of the Uruguayan Republic's Faculty of the Humanities and Educational Sciences.

Citations

Living people
1958 births
Writers from Montevideo
20th-century Uruguayan historians
21st-century Uruguayan historians